Major League Soccer has a set of emergency goalkeepers who are signed to a contract with the league and are loaned to teams during emergencies in which they are missing a goalkeeper due to injuries or suspensions. The pool goalkeeper trains with an MLS club or an affiliated team when not assigned to a team; some pool goalkeepers, including Tim Melia, have gone on to be signed to permanent contract with their assigned teams.

When originally created, the league had several goalkeepers on their pool roster as roster sizes were small (around 20 players), with teams commonly only having two goalkeepers signed to the roster. However, MLS rosters have since increased to include up to 30 players and teams are required to carry three goalkeepers. In addition, the league's "extreme hardship" roster rules allow teams to bring up a goalkeeper from its MLS Next Pro side or another affiliate on a short-term basis, which has resulted in the need for a pool goalkeeper lessening. Whereas prior years saw three to four pool goalkeepers signed, now there is usually only one or two keepers on the pool roster.

List

Lists prior to 2007 are incomplete

References

MLS Pool Goalkeepers

Major League Soccer rules and regulations